Ed. Westermayer was a piano manufacturer in Berlin, Germany. 

It was founded in 1863. The company was located at Simeonstraße 10. The owner Paul Westermayer was awarded an imperial and royal warrant of appointment to the court of Austria-Hungary.

References

External links 

1863 establishments in Prussia
Companies of Prussia
Musical instrument manufacturing companies based in Berlin
Piano manufacturing companies of Germany
Purveyors to the Imperial and Royal Court